E72 may refer to:
 European route E72
 King's Indian Defense, Encyclopaedia of Chess Openings code
 Nokia E72
 Kitakinki-Toyooka Expressway, route E72 in Japan
 GER Class E72, a class of British steam locomotives